Aleksandr Gusev may refer to:

 Aleksandr Gusev (field hockey) (1955–1994), field hockey player from the Soviet Union
 Alexander Gusev (ice hockey) (1947–2020), Soviet ice hockey player and Olympic champion
 Alexandr Vladimirovich Gussev or Gusev (1917–1999), Russian parasitologist, specialist of monogeneans
 Aleksandr Gusev (politician) (born 1963), Russian politician and governor of Voronezh Oblast
 Alexander Gusev (scientist), statistical geneticist with an interest in human genetics and oncogenomics